Brycinus rhodopleura is a species of fish in the family Alestidae. It is endemic to Tanzania.  Its natural habitats are rivers and freshwater lakes.

References

Brycinus
Fish of Tanzania
Taxa named by George Albert Boulenger
Fish described in 1906
Taxonomy articles created by Polbot